Aenictus asperivalvus is a species of light brown army ant found in Cote D'Ivoire.

References

Dorylinae
Hymenoptera of Africa
Insects described in 1919